Summit Brewing Company is a regional craft brewery in Saint Paul, Minnesota, United States, that brews a wide selection of beers. In 2017, Summit Brewing was the 25th largest craft brewer in the country and produced approximately 115,000 barrels of beer, with a capacity of 240,000 barrels per year. Their flagship beer has been an English Pale Ale branded as Summit Extra Pale Ale.

The brewery was founded in 1986 by local homebrewer Mark Stutrud and a group of his friends in an old auto parts warehouse on St. Paul's University Avenue. The company grew as the beers become popular locally. In 1987, the Great Northern Porter won a gold medal at the Great American Beer Festival and was featured on the cover of Michael Jackson's New World Guide to Beer (1988). By 1998 the company's beer production had exceeded the capacity of the original University Avenue brewery, and a new brewery, designed by architect Peter O'Brien, was built on the west end of St. Paul, overlooking the Mississippi River. Still in operation, it was the first new brewery built from the ground up in St. Paul since before Prohibition. Having outgrown its original brewing equipment, Summit sold its 1938-vintage brew house to Mt. Shasta Brewing Company in Northern California. They then purchased an all-copper, authentic German brew house built in 1971 from the Hürnerbräu Brewery in Ansbach Germany.

, Summit beers are available from distributors in five U.S. states (Iowa, Minnesota, North Dakota, South Dakota, and Wisconsin). The brewery currently brews seven year-round styles, a variety of seasonal styles, and limited release beers. 2018 saw the launch of new year-round beers such as Summit Dakota Soul, a traditional Czech-style Pilsener; Summit Skip Rock, a white ale; and Summit Keller Pils, an award-winning, unfiltered German-style Pilsner.

In July 2018, Summit Brewing Company completed a renovation of the Summit Ratskeller, its public bar and patio area. The Summit Ratskeller features Summit's entire lineup of beers, plus exclusive beers serves only on site, tours, and the Summit Brewing Co. Gift Shop.

, Summit Brewing Co. remains the second-largest brewery in Minnesota, after August Schell Brewing Company.

References

External links
 
Summit Brewing Company

Beer brewing companies based in Minnesota
Manufacturing companies based in Saint Paul, Minnesota